The Five Dravidian were five Tamil Chiefs apparently from the Pandyan Dynasty who ruled the Anuradhapura Kingdom for 14 years from 103 BC to 88 BC.

Background

Before the Five Dravidians invaded the island, the Anuradhapura Kingdom was ruled by Valagamba (104–103 BC, 89–76 BC) also known as Vatthagamani Abhaya. In 103 BC Valagamba was overthrown by these five conquerors from South India, who ruled until 89 BC when they were defeated by Valagamba, who was then able to rule his kingdom once more.

Rulers

Pulahatta

Pulahatta was the first of the Five Dravidians. He was a Tamil chief from the Pandyan Dynasty, in South India, who defeated the reigning monarch Valagamba, who had only come to the throne five months before. He appointed Bahiya as his Chief Minister and reigned for three years until he was murdered in 100 BC by Bahiya.

Bahiya

Bahiya was the second of the Five Dravidians, he ruled from 100 BC to 98 BC. Chief Minister of Pulahatha, during Pulahatha's reign, he murdered him and ruled as king. Bahiya's reign came to an end when his Prime Minister, Panya Mara, killed him after only two years on the throne.

Panya Mara

Panya Mara, the third of the Five Dravidians reigned from 98 BC to 91 BC, the longest of any of the Five Dravidians. Before ascending the throne he held the office of Prime Minister under Bahiya, whom Panya Mara then killed taking the throne while appointing Pilaya Mara as his Chief Minister.

Pilaya Mara

Pilaya Mara was King of Anuradhapura from 91 BC to 90 BC. Assuming the throne like his predecessors, by murdering Panya Mara, while he was his Chief Minister. Pilaya Mara had the shortest of all the reigns of the Five Dravidians only lasting seven months, being killed by his own Chief Minister, Dathika.

Dathika

Dathika was the last of the Five Dravidians, who ruled for two years from 90 BC to 88 BC. Dathika came to the throne after murdering his king Pilaya Mara, for whom he was Chief Minister. In 88 BC he was killed, losing the throne, by Valagamba restoring his reign and the dynasty of the House of Vijaya who had reigned since the start of the monarchy. Valagamba went on to rule the Anuradhapura Kingdom for the next 12 years.

See also
 List of Sri Lankan monarchs
 History of Sri Lanka
 Mahavamsa

References

External links
 Discover Sri Lanka - List of kings & kingdoms in Sri Lanka
  VIJAYA and the Lankan Monarchs
 Lakdiva - LIST OF THE SOVEREIGNS OF LANKA
 The Mahavamsa History of Sri Lanka The Great Chronicle of Sri Lanka
 Complete list of Sri Lankan Leaders

Sri Lanka
D
Monarchs
D
Tamil monarchs
D
D